Helen Scott  (née Hough) is an actress best known for her work in theatre and on Australian television. She has also appeared in musicals in England.

Biography 

She remains most well known for her role as Matron Marta Kurtesz, an original character in serial A Country Practice in 1981. Scott played the character utilising a foreign accent. Her character was briefly involved in a romance storyline with Dr. Terence Elliott (played by Shane Porteous), however she left the series in 1983, with her character returning to her native Budapest, Hungary with an old friend. She was replaced as Matron by actress Joan Sydney, who would have a long run playing the role of Maggie Sloane until 1990, and then appearing again when the series, which aired originally on Network Seven, was briefly relaunched by Network Ten in 1994.

Filmography (selected)

External links
 

Living people
Place of birth missing (living people)
Australian soap opera actresses
Australian stage actresses
Year of birth missing (living people)